Buddleja utahensis is a species of Buddleja endemic to the southwestern United States (northwest Arizona, eastern California, southern Nevada, and southwestern Utah), where it is known by the common names Utah butterfly bush and Panamint butterfly bush. Named and described by Coville in 1892, the shrub favours limestone outcrops at elevations of 700–2000 m,
where it is often found in association with Joshua trees.

Description
Buddleja utahensis is a compact, dwarf dioecious shrub reaching 0.3–1.0 m in height. The bark is rimose and greyish, while the plant structure is characterized by persistent naked twigs. The younger branches are terete, bearing subsessile linear to oblong leaves 1.5–3.5 cm long by 0.3–0.5 cm wide, rounded at the apex and attenuate at the base. Both surfaces of the leaves are densely short tomentose, bestowing a silver-grey appearance. The inflorescences are 4–12 cm long, with 3–7 pairs of heads forming verticels, subtended by leafy bracts. The verticels are 0.5–1.13 cm in diameter, each comprising 15–30 pale yellow flowers, the corollas 4–5 mm long. Capsules are  up to 2.5 mm long, with numerous globose seeds up to 0.4 mm in diam.

Cultivation
Buddleja utahensis is very rare in cultivation; it is a difficult plant to raise in temperate regions, demanding very free draining soil and infrequent watering. Hardiness: USDA zone 8.

References

External links
Calflora Database: Buddleja utahensis (Panamint butterfly bush,  Summer lilac, Utah butterflybush)
 Jepson eFlora (JM2) treatment of Buddleja utahensis
UC Photos gallery — Buddleja utahensis

utahensis
Flora of the California desert regions
Flora of the Southwestern United States
North American desert flora
Natural history of the Mojave Desert
Plants described in 1892
Dioecious plants
Flora without expected TNC conservation status